Duni Chand Chambial (born 29 September 1950), is a contemporary bilingual poet from Himachal Pradesh and a critic who, as an editor in chief, has been editing Poetcrit, a reviewed international journal for more than three decades. Chambial appeared as an Indian English poet by publishing his first volume, Broken Images, in 1983. He rooted himself as a poet in Indian English Poetry with the continuous publication of his several other English poetry collections and one in Hindi. His poems have been translated into many languages.

List of works

Poetry collections
  Broken Images (1983), Samkaleen Prakashan, New Delhi, India
  The Poetry OF Himachal Pradesh (1983), edited, Poetry Publications, Aska (Orissa), India
  The Cargoes of the Bleeding Hearts & Other Poems ( 1984), Golden Books of India, Calcutta, India
  Himpaat (Poems in Hindi) (1985), Kanta Sahitya Prakashan, Maranda, Himachal Pradesh, India
  Perceptions (1986), Kanta Sahitya Prakashan, Maranda, Himachal Pradesh, India	
  Gyrating Hawks & Sinking Roads (1996), Kanta Sahitya Prakashan, Maranda, Himachal Pradesh, India	
  Before The Petals Unfold (2002), Poetcrit Publications, Maranda, Himachal Pradesh, India
  This Promising Age and Other Poems (2004), Poetcrit Publications, Maranda, Himachal Pradesh, India
  Collected Poems: 1979 – 2004  (2004), Poetcrit Publications, Maranda, Himachal Pradesh, India	
  Mellow Tones (2009), Publish America, Baltimore, United States
  Words (2010), Aadi Publications, Jaipur, India
  Words: 1979–2010 (A Collection of Poems)  (2012) Aadi Publications, Jaipur, India
  Hour of Antipathy (2014), Poetcrit Publications, Maranda, Himachal Pradesh, India
 Songs of Sonority and Hope (2018), Authorpress, New Delhi, India.
 Song of Light and Other Poems: 2017-2020 (2020), Aadi Publications, Jaipur, India.

Criticism
 Death and Suffering in the Poetry of Krishna Srinivas(1996), Poet Publications, Chennai, India 
 The Theme of Death and Suffering in the Poetry of O. P. Bhatnagar (1999), Kanta Sahitya Prakashan, Maranda, Himachal Pradesh India 	
 English Poetry in India: A Secular Viewpoint (2011), Aavishkar Publishers, Distributors, Jaipur, India .

Awards and honours 
In recognition of his achievements Professor Chambial has received several awards and honours, among them:
Lachian Art Letters Bronze Medal, 1987 Trans-World Poetry Exposition, Campbell, California (United States);
7th Poetry Day Australia, Australia Bicentenary, Gold medal, 26 August 1988;
Poetry Day Australia, Ist decade Bronze Medal, 1991–92;
Certificate for Excellence as International Writer, 30 April 1992, Directory of International Writers (University of Colorado, United States);
POETCRIT: POETRY MAGAZINE OF THE YEAR, 1995 by International Writers Association;
Michael Madhusudan Academy Award 1995, Michael Madhusudan Academy, Calcutta;
Poetry Day Australia, Dove in Peace Award, Gold medal, 2000;
Hon. Member, Governing board of directors, ABI, Raleigh (United States);
Second Best Fixed Form Poet of the Year 2003, Competition organized by Metverse Muse, Visakhapatnam (Andhra Pradesh);
Participated in 6th World Poetry Day organized under the aegis of Sikkim Akademy, Gangtok (21–24 March 2006);
"Life Time Achievement Award" by Poetry Intercontinental, Chennai, 2009.

References 

1950 births
Living people
Indian male poets
English-language poets from India
Poets from Himachal Pradesh
Indian literary critics